Jean-Théodore Monbeig-Andrieu (22 October 1875 in Salies-de-Béarn – 12 June 1914 in Litang) was a French Catholic missionary and botanist who collected plants for the Paris Natural History Museum from northern Yunnan where he was posted. He also collected butterflies for Charles Oberthür.

Monbeig was ordained for the Paris Foreign Missions Society and sent to the Tibetan part of Yunnan in 1899. He assisted Father  who was murdered in 1905 in Tse-kou with other colleagues. Father Soulié was also killed by a Lama revolt at that time.

Father Monbeig moved afterwards to more secure Cizhong with his parishioners. He built the church of the village (dedicated to Holy Heart) and founded a convent for young Tibetan women to be village teachers. He devoted his free time to collecting plants from the mountains.

In November 1913, the Apostolic Vicar of Tibet in Tatsienlu, called Monbeig to Batang, Sichuan to revive the Christian community there. He set to work immediately and baptised some new converts. He was murdered near Litang the next year, while reaching a mission post.

More than 20 species were named after him, such as Deutzia monbeigii W.W.Sm. or Cornus monbeigii Hemsl.

See also 
 Catholic Church in Sichuan
 Christianity in Tibet

References

Bibliography 
J. H. Barnhart (1965) Biographical Notes Upon Botanists, 2:504
E. H. M. Cox (1945), Plant Hunting in China : 120

1875 births
1914 deaths
20th-century French botanists
Roman Catholic missionaries in Tibet
Roman Catholic missionaries in Sichuan
Paris Foreign Missions Society missionaries
French Roman Catholic missionaries
Roman Catholic missionaries in China
French people murdered abroad
People murdered in China
French expatriates in China
Missionary botanists